The 2002–03 South Dakota State Jackrabbits women's basketball represented South Dakota State University in the 2002–03 NCAA Division II women's basketball season. The Jackrabbits, led by third year head coach Aaron Johnston, played their home games in Frost Arena in Brookings, South Dakota, and played as a member of the NCC. They finished the season tied for first place in the NCC losing in the second game of the conference tournament. However, The Jackrabbits won all six of their NCAA tournament games, claiming the NCAA D–II Championship over Northern Kentucky, 65–50.

Schedule

|-
!colspan=9 style="background:#003896; color:#F7D417;"| Regular season

|-
!colspan=9 style="background:#003896; color:#F7D417;"| NCC Wells Fargo Tournament

|-
!colspan=9 style="background:#003896; color:#F7D417;"| NCAA Division II Tournament

Source:

References

South Dakota State Jackrabbits women's basketball seasons
Jackrabbits
Jackrabbits
2002–03 in American women's college basketball